Phillip "Philly" Ryan (1916 - 1991) was an Irish hurler who played for the Tipperary senior team.

Born in Borrisoleigh, County Tipperary, Ryan first arrived on the inter-county scene at the age of seventeen when he first linked up with the Tipperary minor team. He joined the senior panel during the 1937 championship. Ryan was a non-playing substitute for that year but was recalled to the team fourteen years later. During that time he won two All-Ireland medals and two Munster medals as a non-playing substitute.

At club level Ryan was a three-time championship medallist with Borris–Ileigh.

Ryan retired from inter-county hurling following the conclusion of the 1951 championship.

In retirement from playing Ryan became involved in team management and coaching. He was a selector with the Tipperary under-21 team between 1969 and 1970.

Honours

Player

Borris–Ileigh
Tipperary Senior Hurling Championship (3): 1949, 1950, 1953

Tipperary
All-Ireland Senior Hurling Championship (2): 1937 (sub), 1951 (sub)
Munster Senior Hurling Championship (2): 1937 (sub), 1951 (sub)

References

1916 births
1991 deaths
Borris-Ileigh hurlers
Tipperary inter-county hurlers
Hurling selectors